is a former Japanese football player.

Playing career
Nebiki was born in Osaka Prefecture on September 7, 1977. He joined J1 League club Kashiwa Reysol from youth team in 1996. He played many matches as center back from 2001. However he could hardly play in the match behind young player Mitsuru Nagata and Naoya Kondo from 2003. In June 2004, he moved to J2 League club Vegalta Sendai on loan. He played as regular player in 2 seasons. In 2006, he returned to Kashiwa Reysol. However he could not play at all in the match and retired end of 2006 season.

Club statistics

References

External links

1977 births
Living people
Association football people from Osaka Prefecture
Japanese footballers
J1 League players
J2 League players
Kashiwa Reysol players
Vegalta Sendai players
Association football defenders